The 1916 United States presidential election in Michigan took place on November 7, 1916, as part of the 1916 United States presidential election. Voters chose 15 representatives, or electors, to the Electoral College, who voted for president and vice president.

Michigan voted for Republican candidate Charles E. Hughes over Democratic incumbent Woodrow Wilson, carrying over 52% of the popular vote. As of the 2020 U.S. presidential election, this is the last time the Republican candidate won Michigan without carrying Kent County, home of Grand Rapids.

Results

Results by county

See also
 United States presidential elections in Michigan

References

Michigan
1916
1916 Michigan elections